"90's Girl" is a song by American vocal group BlackGirl, released on July 24, 1994 and the second single of the group's album Treat U Right. It reached #71 on the US Billboard Hot 100 and #23 on the UK Singles Chart.

Music Video
The music video for "90's Girl" begins with children sitting on steps outside an apartment building. The little boy explains that when they grow up she will become his wife, she will be a housewife and have lots children. The little girl replies that when she grows up she will be a 90's girl just her mother.
The song starts and the group members are seen, smartly dressed, on their way to work. They arrive together at a boutique called "BG Couture". They perform the song in the boutique while serving customers. There are also shots of the group in matching silver outfits sitting on and dancing around a low rider car in an alley before performing a choreographed dance routine with back up dancers in the street. There are also scenes of the girls singing on top of a building.

Track listing

Maxi-Promo CD Single

1.) 90's Girl (Encore Alt. Remix) [Radio Edit]
2.) 90's Girl (Encore Extended Alt. Remix)
3.) 90's Girl (Encore Remix w/o Rap)
4.) 90's Girl (Video Edit)
5.) 90's Girl (Encore Instrumental)
6.) 90's Girl (Encore A Capella)
7.) 90's Girl (Original Album Version) [Radio Edit]

Chart information

References

BlackGirl songs
1994 songs
1994 singles
Songs written by Jimmy Jam and Terry Lewis
Song recordings produced by Teddy Riley
RCA Records singles